Tenzing Norbu Thongdok is an Indian politician from the North Eastern state Arunachal Pradesh.
In the 2014 election he was elected as a Member of the Arunachal Pradesh Legislative Assembly from Kalaktang. Prior to entering politics he was Chief Engineer in PWD, Government of Arunachal Pradesh and retired from service as Secretary to Government of Arunachal Pradesh. On being elected as Member of legislative Assembly he was appointed Principal Advisor to Chief Minister and Parliamentary secretary for PWD. Later, on his second term in Arunachal Pradesh Legislative Assembly, he was elected unopposed as Deputy speaker in 2014. And in 2016 he was inducted as Cabinet Minister In PPA led Government. Presently he is the Speaker of Arunachal Pradesh Legislative assembly.

See also
 Arunachal Pradesh Legislative Assembly

References

People's Party of Arunachal politicians
Bharatiya Janata Party politicians from Arunachal Pradesh
Indian National Congress politicians
Living people
Arunachal Pradesh MLAs 2014–2019
Speakers of the Arunachal Pradesh Legislative Assembly
Deputy Speakers of the Arunachal Pradesh Legislative Assembly
Year of birth missing (living people)